Halfway Around the World is the second single from the album Teen Spirit by A-Teens.  The single peaked at number one in Sweden and Japan after a few weeks inside the Top Ten earning a gold certification. The song charted well in Asia and Latin America.

Music video
The video premiered in February 2001 and it was directed by Mikadelica. It shows the A-Teens in different parts of the world (Peru, Paris, somewhere in the North, and China) and the action takes place in different seasons, but all of this ends up taking place on a set for a film shooting. There is also a love story between two staff members. The song tells the story of two people who are "halfway around the world," but that them being distanced from each other won't stop their love for each other.

Releases
European 2-Track CD Single
Halfway Around the World [Radio Version] - 3:36
Can't Stop the Pop - 3:00

European/Mexican CD Maxi
Halfway Around the World [Radio Version] - 3:36
Halfway Around the World [Earthbound's Halfway Around The Earth Mix Long] - 6:20
Halfway Around the World [M12 Massive Club Mix] - 6:35
Video: Upside Down

UK CD
Halfway Around the World [Radio Version] - 3:41
Gimme! Gimme! Gimme! (A Man After Midnight) - 3:56
Halfway Around the World [Almighty Definitive Remix] - 7:45
Video: Halfway Around the World

UK Cassette
Halfway Around the World [Radio Version] - 3:41
Gimme! Gimme! Gimme! (A Man After Midnight) - 3:56
Halfway Around the World [Almighty Definitive Remix] - 7:45

Promo CD
Halfway Around the World [Radio Version] - 3:36

Charts and certifications

Weekly charts

Year-end charts

Certifications and sales

Release history

References

2001 singles
A-Teens songs
Universal Music Group singles
Songs written by Tommy Tysper
2000 songs
Songs written by Marcus Sepehrmanesh